Saint-Pierre Airport  is a regional airport located  south of Saint-Pierre, in the French overseas collectivity of Saint Pierre and Miquelon, off the east coast of Canada near Newfoundland.

Overview
The airport was completed in August 1999 and consists of four buildings and a control tower. The old airport, opened in 1965 and located on the south side of the inner harbour, was re-located due to the lack of room for expansion (The current runway is  when compared to the old 11/29 at ). The main terminal building is a two storey structure. The old airport is located in city centre of St. Pierre and is being redeveloped for housing complexes. The control tower, terminal building, hangar, and part of the old runway (mark number 29) are intact. The airport project cost 370 million French francs.

Unusually, the airport's ICAO airport code, LFVP, begins with an L, representative of the codes used in France (and nearly all of southern Europe), despite the geographical proximity to Canada's codes which begin with C. While not entirely unheard of elsewhere, it is rarely seen in airports of other overseas territories or possessions of European nations, including France, which tend to hew to the most geographically relevant letter code, as opposed to the most politically relevant. Airports in French Guiana, for example, use South America's S prefix, despite French Guiana's being an overseas department of France.

Facilities
  passenger terminal
  maintenance building to store snow plows
  aircraft hangars and workshop
  civil aviation buildings

The airport currently handles turboprop aircraft and Boeing 737.

All other aircraft at the airport are private aircraft for general aviation.

Airline and destinations 

In July 2018, the first nonstop flights from the islands to mainland France launched on Air Saint-Pierre with seasonal summer service from Saint-Pierre directly to Charles de Gaulle Airport in Paris. Previously, all connecting traffic to mainland France was done through airports in Canada, such as Halifax or Montréal–Trudeau.

Statistics

Gallery

See also
List of airports in Saint Pierre and Miquelon
Miquelon Airport
Transport in Saint Pierre and Miquelon

References

External links

 Le Service de l'Aviation Civile de Saint-Pierre et Miquelon 

Airports in Saint Pierre and Miquelon
Saint-Pierre, Saint Pierre and Miquelon
Airports established in 1999
1999 establishments in Saint Pierre and Miquelon